Euphrasia alpina is a plant from the genus Euphrasia, in the family Orobanchaceae. Three subspecies are recognized: E. a. alpina, E. a cantabrica, E. a. pulchra. Like all Euphrasia species, E. alpina is hemiparasitic.

Distribution 
E. alpina is native to France, Spain, Switzerland, and Italy.

References 

alpina
Plants described in 1783